Nilo Ozib (born 26 September 1956) is a Mexican windsurfer. He competed in the 1988 Summer Olympics.

References

1956 births
Living people
Sailors at the 1988 Summer Olympics – Division II
Olympic sailors of Mexico
Mexican male sailors (sport)
Mexican windsurfers